Prithviraj Singh "Biki" Oberoi (born 1929) is the Executive Chairman of the  EIH Limited (formerly East India Hotels), the flagship company of India’s The Oberoi Group, which runs a chain of luxury hotels, The Trident hotels and Oberoi Hotels & Resorts., the third largest hospitality chain in India.

In 2008, the Government of India awarded Oberoi with the Padma Vibushan, India's second-highest civilian honour, in recognition of his exceptional service to the country. Popularly known as "Biki", in 2002 he took over as the Chairman of EIH Limited with the death of Mohan Singh Oberoi, his father and the founding chairman of The Oberoi group, and remained CEO of EIH Ltd until 2013.

Oberoi was educated at St. Paul's School, Darjeeling, India, and later the United Kingdom and Switzerland. He has served as a Director of Jet Airways (India) Limited since March 29, 2004. Oberoi is a graduate in Hotel management from Lausanne, Switzerland. In 2010, he was recognised as the “Corporate Hotelier of the World” by Hotels magazine.

He has a son, Vikram, CEO and Managing Director of EIH, and two daughters. At 89, he continues to live at the Oberoi Farm house-cum-office on the outskirts of Delhi. He has a nephew, Arjun Oberoi. He currently looks after the project development and is designated as the Managing Director-Development.

In June 2022, Oberoi was recognized by the International Hospitality Institute on the Global 100 in Hospitality as one of the 100 Most Powerful People in Global Hospitality.

References

The Oberoi Group
Punjabi people
Recipients of the Padma Vibhushan in trade & industry
Indian hoteliers
Living people
1929 births
Indian chief executives
St. Paul's School, Darjeeling alumni